Willow Wash is an ephemeral stream or wash in San Bernardino County, California. From Seventeen Mile Point, its course breaks up into several distributary washes that run west and southwest toward Soda Lake. It runs southwest with heavy sands south and west of the Cima Volcanic Range and Volcanic Fields, parallels Kelbaker Road, turning northward until it reaches Seventeen Mile Point.

References

Rivers of San Bernardino County, California